Asanada brevicornis is a species of centipede in the Scolopendridae family. It was first described in 1885 by Danish entomologist Frederik Vilhelm August Meinert.

Distribution
The species’ distribution ranges from India, Burma and the Andaman Islands to the Philippines, Sumba, New Guinea and north-eastern Australia.

Behaviour
The centipedes are solitary terrestrial predators that inhabit plant litter, soil and rotting wood.

References

 

 
brevicornis
Centipedes of Australia
Fauna of Queensland
Arthropods of Asia
Arthropods of New Guinea
Animals described in 1885
Taxa named by Frederik Vilhelm August Meinert